Mission to Rescue is a 2021 Kenyan action film directed by Gilbert Lukalia. It was selected as the 2021 Kenyan entry for the Best International Feature Film at the 94th Academy Awards. The film is based on a true story based on the Al-Shabaab abduction of a French tourist in Kenya in 2011.

Cast
The film features  Melvin Alusa, Warsame Abdi, Abdi Yusuf, Emmanuel Mugo, Andreo Kamau, Abubakar Mwenda, Sam Psenjen, Anthony Ndung’u, Bilal Mwaura, Justin Mirichi, Abajah Brian, Melissa Kiplagat, Brian Ogola, and Mwamburi Maole.

Plot
The film is based on a true story based on the Al-Shabaab abduction of a French tourist in the coastal town of Kenya in 2011.

Awards and nominations

See also
 List of submissions to the 94th Academy Awards for Best International Feature Film
 List of Kenyan submissions for the Academy Award for Best International Feature Film

References

External links
 Official site

2021 films
2021 drama films
Kenyan drama films
Swahili-language films